Chris or Christopher Coleman may refer to:

Sports
 Christopher Coleman (bobsleigh) (born 1967), American bobsledder
 Christopher Coleman (cricketer) (born 1980), former English cricketer
 Chris Coleman (footballer) (born 1970), Welsh football manager and former Wales international player

Others
 Christopher Coleman (businessman) (born 1968), British businessman
 Chris Coleman (politician) (born 1961), Minnesota politician and mayor of Saint Paul
 Chris Coleman, a character in episode of the American drama TV series Bull